Yulia Khavronina (born 20 May 1992) is a Russian handballer who plays for Israel handball team Maccabi Arazim Ramat Gan.

International honours 
EHF Cup Winners' Cup: 
Finalist: 2014

References
 

  
1992 births
Living people
Sportspeople from Astrakhan
Russian female handball players 
Expatriate handball players
Russian expatriates in Hungary 
Russian expatriates in France 
Russian expatriate sportspeople in Romania